Sivutsa Stars was a South African football club based in Nelspruit, Mpumalanga that played in the National First Division.

Founded in 2009, Stars managed promotion to the National First Division in 2011 by finishing second at the Vodacom League play-offs.

Achievements
2010–11 Vodacom League Mpumalanga champions

Managers
 John Tlale (Aug 8, 2013 – Mar 13, 2014)
 Duncan Lechesa (Mar 13, 2014 – 2014)

Disestablishment
Sivutsa Stars was bought out by millionaire couple Shauwn and Sbu Mpisane and relocated the club to Durban. They later renamed the club to Royal Eagles.

Shirt sponsor & kit manufacturer
Shirt sponsor: None
Kit manufacturer: Kappa

References

External links
 
Premier Soccer League
NFD Club Info

Association football clubs established in 2009
SAFA Second Division clubs
Soccer clubs in Mpumalanga
National First Division clubs
2009 establishments in South Africa
Sivutsa Stars F.C.